Inarzo is a comune (municipality) in the Province of Varese in the Italian region Lombardy, located about  northwest of Milan and about  southwest of Varese.

Inarzo borders the following municipalities: Bodio Lomnago, Cazzago Brabbia, Casale Litta, Varano Borghi, Ternate, Biandronno.

Population history

References

External links
 www.comune.inarzo.va.it

Cities and towns in Lombardy